Vetulonia parajeffreysi is a species of sea snail, a marine gastropod mollusk, unassigned in the superfamily Seguenzioidea.

Description
The shell grows to a height of 3 mm.

Distribution
This species occurs in the Gulf of Mexico and in the Atlantic Ocean off Brazil, found at depths between 730 m and 1600 m.

References

 Absalão R.S. & Pimenta A.D. (2005). New records and new species of Vetulonia Dall, 1913 and Brookula Iredale, 1912 from Brazil (Gastropoda, Trochidae). The Veliger 47(3): 193–201
 Rosenberg, G., F. Moretzsohn, and E. F. García. 2009. Gastropoda (Mollusca) of the Gulf of Mexico, Pp. 579–699 in Felder, D.L. and D.K. Camp (eds.), Gulf of Mexico–Origins, Waters, and Biota. Biodiversity. Texas A&M Press, College Station, Texas

parajeffreysi
Gastropods described in 2005